John Bolloten, also known as The Rootsman, is a musician and DJ based in Bradford, England. Bolloten is also a social documentary photographer.

Early life
Bolloten was born in Brighton. He moved to Scotland at the age of nine.

Music career
Bolloten's musical career began when he was living in Edinburgh, Scotland and taught himself to play guitar in 1978 at the age of 13 and formed his first punk band. After 3 concerts, he decided that being a guitarist in a band was not for him and he retired from that aspect of the music business. He moved to Bradford at the age of 18 in 1983. He worked for over two years in the local Roots Record Shop, where he began to be known as 'Rootsman'.

Starting off making roots reggae in 1985, he began to incorporate African, Middle Eastern, Asian, trip hop and electronic dance music elements into his experimental dub music. In the mid-1990s, he started his own Third Eye label, and went on to work with artists such as Muslimgauze, Alex Paterson, Soulfly, Junior Delgado, and Dub Syndicate.

In the late 1990s, Bolloten converted to Islam, and his music took on an increasingly spiritual quality.

His 2002 album New Testament featured guest vocals from Sandeeno, U Brown, Earl 16, Mike Brooks, and Daddy Freddy.

Photography
Bolloten is also a social documentary photographer.

Discography
City Rockers EP (1994)
"Koyaanisqatsi" (1994)
"In Dub We Trust" (1995)
"International Language of Dub: The Rootsman Remixed" (1995)
Natural Born Thrillers EP (1995)
"Authorised Versions" (1996)
Mother of Nature EP (1996)
Pass the Chalice EP (1996)
"Into the Light" (1996)
City of Djinn" (with Muslimgauze) (1997)
"Out of the Darkness: The Rootsman Remixed" (1997)
"Rebirth" (1997)
"Third Eye Dimensions" (1997)
"52 Days to Timbuktu" (1998)
"The Final Frontier - The Rootsman Remixed" (1998)
"Union of Souls" (1998)
We Come Rough EP (1998)
Imitator EP (1999)
"Realms of the Unseen" (1999)
"Return to the City of Djinn" (with Muslimgauze) (1999)
Versions of the Unseen EP (1999)
Old School New School (with Daddy Freddy) (2000)
"Roots Bloody Rootsman" (2001)
"Al Aqsa Intifada" (2002)
"New Testament" (2002)
Joy and Sorrow EP (2003)
Showcase EP (2003)
"Walk with Jah" (2003)
"Intifada", "Intifada Dub" b/w (with Celtarabia) "Valley of the Kings", "Valley of Dub" - Partial Records 10" (2014)
"Fittest of the Fittest", "When the Eye Opens" b/w "Only Jah", "Exodus" (Vibronics Remix) - Partial Records 10" (2015)

References

External links 

Bolloten's photography site

Dub musicians
English DJs
English reggae musicians
Musicians from Bradford
Social documentary photographers
21st-century British photographers
English photographers
Living people
Year of birth missing (living people)